James Buller may refer to:

James Buller (the elder) (1678–1710), British MP for Saltash, Cornwall 1701–1705 and 1708–1710
James Buller (1717–1765) (1717–1765), British MP for East Looe 1741–1748 and Cornwall 1748–1765
James Buller (1766–1827), British MP for Exeter and East Looe 1802
James Buller (1772–1830), British MP for West Looe
James Wentworth Buller (1798–1865), British Member of Parliament for Exeter, and for North Devon

See also
Sir James Buller East, 2nd Baronet (1789–1878), British MP for Winchester